Deleted in azoospermia-like is a protein that in humans is encoded by the DAZL gene.

Function 

The DAZ (Deleted in AZoospermia) gene family encodes potential RNA binding proteins that are expressed in prenatal and postnatal germ cells of males and females. The protein encoded by this gene is localized to the nucleus and cytoplasm of fetal germ cells and to the cytoplasm of developing oocytes. In the testis, this protein is localized to the nucleus of spermatogonia but relocates to the cytoplasm during meiosis where it persists in spermatids and spermatozoa. Transposition and amplification of this autosomal gene during primate evolution gave rise to the DAZ gene cluster on the Y chromosome. Mutations in this gene have been linked to severe spermatogenic failure and infertility in males.

In mice and pigs deficient in DAZL, PGCs migrate to the gonad but do not undertake germ cell determination, and may instead produce germ cell tumors.

Interactions 

DAZL has been shown to interact with DAZ1.

References

Further reading